Bhupinder Singh Brar (1 July 1926 – 15 March 1995) was a politician from the Indian state of Punjab. He represented Punjab in the Rajya Sabha, the Council of States of India's parliament from 1967 to 1970.

Singh was survived by his wife, Prakash Brar, one son, and one daughter.

References

Rajya Sabha members from Punjab, India
1926 births
1995 deaths